Kalateh-ye Seyyed Ali (also Romanized as Kalāteh-ye Seyyed ‘Alī) is a village in Tus Rural District, in the Central District of Mashhad County, Razavi Khorasan Province, Iran. At the 2006 census, its population was 238, in 61 families.

References 

Populated places in Mashhad County